NCAA Football 2004 is an American football video game released in 2003 by Tiburon. It is the successor to NCAA Football 2003 in the NCAA Football series. The player on the cover is former USC quarterback Carson Palmer. The game is available for play with the N-Gage. Commentators are Brad Nessler, Kirk Herbstreit and Lee Corso. The game is an EA Sports Bio game, and is compatible with other games with the feature (Madden NFL 2004 and NASCAR Thunder 2004, for example).

Gameplay
The game's gameplay is similar to NCAA Football 2003, but with updated player stats and rosters. Players can rename players or create their own college team. If the player named the school after one of the schools in the game, the announcers use its name and fight song in the game. The game features new on-field presentation features such as players walking out of their locker room area and then onto the field behind a group of flag bearers. It also features player touchdown celebrations which can result in a penalty for unsportsmanlike conduct.

Reception

The game's reviews varied across consoles. According to video game review aggregator Metacritic, the PlayStation 2 release received "universal acclaim" and the GameCube and Xbox releases received "generally favorable" reviews, while the N-Gage release's reviews were "average".

GameSpot named NCAA Football 2004 the best PlayStation 2 game of July 2003.

The game sold 550,000 copies in its first two weeks.

References

External links

2003 video games
College football video games
Electronic Arts games
GameCube games
N-Gage games
PlayStation 2 games
Xbox games
EA Sports games
North America-exclusive video games
Multiplayer and single-player video games
NCAA video games
Video games developed in the United States
Exient Entertainment games